King Rollo Films Ltd, known as King Rollo Films, is an animation production company established in 1978 by David McKee. For over 30 years, the company has been producing cartoons for children's television. Their studios are based in Honiton, England.

History

King Rollo Films is an Independent animation studio lead by Leo Nielsen. We produce timeless animation that is faithful to its origins, collaborating closely with the best artists, writers and producers. King Rollo can adapt and bring to life the characters from a page with a sensitivity which is second to none.

The studio won a BAFTA for Maisy , a BAFTA nomination for Humf and a Daytime EMMY Nomination for Mama Mirabelle's Home Movies.

In 2004, the company split, with the Devon-based production arm and a rights-holding arm separating.

Television series
King Rollo (1980)
Victor & Maria (1981)
Towser (1982)
The Adventures of Spot (1987, 1993)
Ric the Raven (1989)
Anytime Tales (1991) co-production with Abbey Broadcast Communications
Hullaballoo (1994) (Pip the Mouse and Buddy the Elephant segments only)Maisy (1999–2000) with PolyGram Visual Programming and Universal Pictures Visual ProgrammingFimbles (2002) (Animation only)The Paz Show (2003–2006) with Discovery Kids, Telescreen, Egmont Imagination and Open Mind ProductionsWide-Eye (2003) co-production with Abbey Home Media
Walker Books for Young Readers (2005–2007) Mama Mirabelle's Home Movies (2007–2008) co-production with National GeographicHumf (2008–2010) co-production with E1 EntertainmentPoppy Cat'' (2011) co-production with Coolabi

References

External links
King Rollo Films Official Website

British animation studios
Television production companies of the United Kingdom
Mass media companies established in 1978
1978 establishments in England
Honiton
Companies based in Devon